Ceco Manufacturing Company was a Providence, Rhode Island, US, firm which acquired a license to manufacture radio tubes in May 1929. Radio Corporation of America issued the license under Radio Corp. patents. The business was the second corporation licensed to produce radio tubes.

In April 1930, there were fourteen businesses authorized to manufacture radio tubes in the United States. For some time they had a factory in Birmingham, Alabama, but it was closed due to labor discord.  The company was acquired for $8.5 million by Richardson Electronics Ltd., of Franklin Park, Illinois, in September 1985.

References

Companies based in Rhode Island
Electronics companies established in 1929
Electronics companies of the United States
1929 establishments in Rhode Island
Electronics companies disestablished in 1985